= List of presidents of the Philippines on currency =

This is a complete list of Philippine presidents who served by currency appearances, that consists of the heads of state in the history of the Philippines.

Number	Order of office	President	Currency
1	1	Emilio Aguinaldo	5-Piso Banknote (1985–1995) 5-Piso Coin (1991–2017)
2	2	Manuel L. Quezon	200-Peso Banknote (1957) 20-Piso Banknote (1969–present) 20-Piso Coin (2019–present)
3	4	Sergio Osmeña	50-Peso Banknote (1969–present)
4	5	Manuel Roxas	100-Piso bill (1969–present) 500-Pesos Bill (1957)
5	6	Elpidio Quirino	Commemorative 2-Piso Coin (1990)
5	9	Diosdado Pangan Macapagal	200-Piso Banknote; Obverse (2002–present)
6	10	Ferdinand E. Marcos	Commemorative 25-Piso Coin with Ronald Reagan; 5-Piso Bagong Lipunan Coin, 50, 1000 and 5000 Peso Commemorative Coins (1978)
7	11	Corazon C. Aquino	Commemorative 25-Piso Coin with Ronald Reagan (1986) 10,000-piso Commemorative Gold Coin (1992) 500-Piso Banknote (2010–present)
8	12	Fidel V. Ramos	2000-Piso Banknote (1998, 2000) (Philippine Centennial Commemorative Legal Tender Banknote)
9	13	Joseph Ejercito Estrada	2000-peso bill (1998, 2000) (Philippine Centennial Commemorative Legal Tender Banknote)
10	14	Gloria Macapagal Arroyo	200-Piso Banknote; Reverse (2002–2013); Obverse (2010–present) (2002–present)

== Sources ==
- pangulo.ph
